In mathematics, an integration by parts operator is a linear operator used to formulate integration by parts formulae; the most interesting examples of integration by parts operators occur in infinite-dimensional settings and find uses in stochastic analysis and its applications.

Definition

Let E be a Banach space such that both E and its continuous dual space E∗ are separable spaces; let μ be a Borel measure on E.  Let S be any (fixed) subset of the class of functions defined on E.  A linear operator A : S → L2(E, μ; R) is said to be an integration by parts operator for μ if

for every C1 function φ : E → R and all h ∈ S for which either side of the above equality makes sense.  In the above, Dφ(x) denotes the Fréchet derivative of φ at x.

Examples

 Consider an abstract Wiener space i : H → E with abstract Wiener measure γ.  Take S to be the set of all C1 functions from E into E∗; E∗ can be thought of as a subspace of E in view of the inclusions

For h ∈ S, define Ah by

This operator A is an integration by parts operator, also known as the divergence operator; a proof can be found in Elworthy (1974).

 The classical Wiener space C0 of continuous paths in Rn starting at zero and defined on the unit interval [0, 1] has another integration by parts operator.  Let S be the collection

i.e., all bounded, adapted processes with absolutely continuous sample paths.  Let φ : C0 → R be any C1 function such that both φ and Dφ are bounded.  For h ∈ S and λ ∈ R, the Girsanov theorem implies that

Differentiating with respect to λ and setting λ = 0 gives

where (Ah)(x) is the Itō integral

The same relation holds for more general φ by an approximation argument; thus, the Itō integral is an integration by parts operator and can be seen as an infinite-dimensional divergence operator.  This is the same result as the integration by parts formula derived from the Clark-Ocone theorem.

References

   (See section 5.3)
  

Integral calculus
Measure theory
Operator theory
Stochastic calculus